Davutlar is a town in Aydın Province, Turkey.

Geography
Davutlar is a town in Kuşadası district of Aydın Province. At  it lies at the north of the Dilek Peninsula and south of Kuşadası. The original settlement is only a few kilometers to Aegean Sea side and presently new quarters of the town are established at the sea side as summer resorts. The population of Davutlar was 9484  as of 2012.

History
The area around Davutlar was ruled by Carians, Ionians, Lydians, Achaemenid Empire. The battle of Mycale (479 BC) was fought aff shore from Davutlar. Later the area was ruled by Alexander the Great, Pergamon Kingdom and Roman Empire. The first Turkic principality was founded in the 1090s by Tanrıbermiş. During the late 13th century the Aydınoğlu principality dominated the area and finally in the 15th century the area was annexed by the Ottoman Empire. The exact foundation date of the settlement is not known. But it was a town during the last years of the Ottoman Empire. The population of the town was enriched by refugees from Caucasus (mainly Circassians) after the Russo-Turkish War (1877–1878), from Crete following the revolt in Crete in 1896 and from various Balkan countries following the Balkan Wars (1912-1913.)
Davutlar was declared a seat of township in 1969.

Economy
The traditional economic sector is agriculture. Being an Aegean town, Davutlar produces fruits and vegetables. The main industry is olive oil, but the most important activity during the summers is tourism (trade and services to seaside resorts).

References

Populated places in Aydın Province
Towns in Turkey
Kuşadası District